The dredging of the Martín García Canal has been delayed for over ten years because of a dispute between Uruguay and Argentina, which has seriously constrained Uruguay's ports development. The Martin García Canal is a dredged waterway between the River Plate (and its Uruguayan ports) and the Uruguay River, jointly shared by the neighbouring countries.

History
In 2006, Argentina dredged the Mitre Canal to  but refused to all for the Martín García to be dredged to a deeper 36 feet, which would permit the transit of ships with a payload more than 45,000 tons. They have to use the Mitre Canal, on the Argentine side. According to Uruguayan media, interests linked to the port of Buenos Aires and Rosario on the Paraná River, the hub of soybean territory, are not interested in seeing Uruguay's Nueva Palmira flourish, and have consistently lobbied against dredging the Martin Garcia Canal.

The bilateral commission Comisión Administradora del Río de la Plata (CARP) oversees the River Plate basin, and among other issues, the upkeep of the Martin Garcia Canal (which serves the Uruguayan coast), the River Plate and the Canal Mitre (which directly serves Buenos Aires) and obviously is regularly dredged but the Pulp mill dispute affected the negotiations.

See also
 Pulp mill dispute
 1973 Boundary Treaty between Uruguay and Argentina

References

External links
 Argentina bullying Uruguay on canal dredging and Falkland Islands flagged vessels
 Advierten el "peor momento" en relación con Argentina

Argentina–Uruguay relations